Depsite being a traditional strong area for blue bloc parties in Denmark, H.C. Østerby from the Social Democrats had been mayor of Holstebro Municipality since 2010.
The Social Democrats lost a seat in this election, but due to the Green Left gaining a seat, a traditional red bloc majority was possible. It was later announced that H.C. Østerby would continue for a third term.

Electoral system
For elections to Danish municipalities, a number varying from 9 to 31 are chosen to be elected to the municipal council. The seats are then allocated using the D'Hondt method and a closed list proportional representation.
Holstebro Municipality had 27 seats in 2021

Unlike in Danish General Elections, in elections to municipal councils, electoral alliances are allowed.

Electoral alliances  

Electoral Alliance 1

Electoral Alliance 2

Electoral Alliance 3

Results

Notes

References 

Holstebro